Practical arguments are a logical structure used to determine the validity or dependencies of a claim made in natural-language arguments.

Overview...
An argument can be thought of as two or more contradicting tree structures.
The root of each tree is a claim: a belief supported by information.
The root branches out to nodes that are  grounds: supporting information.
The edges connecting them are  warrants: rules or principles.
Claims, grounds and warrants are often not known for certain, so they are presented with a qualifier to indicate their probability.
When a ground is disputable it is a sub claim; in this way the tree can grow to be quite large.

The object of a discussion is often to resolve a difference of opinion. This requires common grounds from which to logically convince one's opponent that one's claim is better supported and that the opponent's claim is supported by false grounds and or warrants (see Occam's razor). If one has no grounds or warrants to support one's claim, then one has no argument, just a belief/claim, perhaps an inaccurate one.

Example 1
Claim: Cats are less intelligent than dogs.
Ground: Cats cannot learn to do tricks as well as dogs do.
Warrant: The ability to learn tricks is a mark of intelligence.

Example 2

Where: C=claim, W=warrant, G=ground, and Q=qualifier

C: Humans can't fly.
Q: In a gravity field without assistance or modification
W1: Because it defies the laws of Newtonian physics it can not be done.
Q: Fact
G1: It defies the laws of Newtonian physics.
Q: Disputable fact
W1.1: Because Newtonian physics applies it would defy the laws of  Newtonian physics.
Q: Fact
G1.1: Newtonian physics apply to all super quantum systems including people
Q: Fact
W1.2: Because there is no print record it is highly improbable.
Q: Highly improbable
G1.2: There is no print record of any reputable person claiming such a thing.
Q: Fact
W2: Because no one has ever flown, it is highly improbable.
Q: Highly improbable
G2: No one has ever flown.
Q: Disputable fact
W2.1: Because there is no print record it is highly improbable.
Q: Highly improbable
G2.1: There is no print record of any reputable person claiming such a thing.
Q: Fact

See also
Argument map
Argumentation framework
Logical argument
Toulmin model of argument

References
Printed:
Writing Arguments by John D. Ramage
The Craft of Research by Wayne C. Booth, Gregory G. Colomb, & Joseph M. Williams
Online
About Argumentation by University of California
Argumentation by Winthrop University

Arguments